Murray Island may refer to:

 Murray Island, Queensland
 Murray Island (Montana), in Lake Koocanusa
 Murray Island (Antarctica), in Antarctica
 Murray Isle, in New York
 Murray Islands, group of islands in the South Orkney Islands
 John Murray Island, near Greenland